Mad at Gravity was a short lived rock band from 2000 to 2003. The band's name came from a poem that lead singer J. Lynn Johnston wrote at age nineteen,  stating that it "just jumped out" and "it had so many applications."

History
The band formed in Southern California in 2000. The group was signed and began recording in a studio after having only made around a dozen live appearances. Their debut album Resonance was released under ARTISTdirect records. Resonance peaked at No. 41 on the Billboard Heatseekers chart.

In promotion of the album, the band toured with such acts as Creed, Filter, Sevendust, and Jerry Cantrell (of Alice in Chains).

"Walk Away" was the band's first and only single, and it reached No. 38 on the Billboard Mainstream Rock charts. Its music video contains sequences from the film Reign of Fire, and is also played in the movie's closing credits along another track of theirs, "Burn".

The band disintegrated in 2003, after vocalist J. Lynn Johnston left the band and the four remaining members were unable to find a suitable replacement .

Discography
Studio albums
2002: Resonance

Band members
 J. Lynn Johnston - vocals
 James Lee Barlow - guitar, keyboards, backing vocals
 Anthony Boscarini - guitar, piano, keyboards, 
 Ben Froehlich - bass
 Jake Fowler - drums

References

Musical groups established in 2000
Musical groups disestablished in 2003
American nu metal musical groups
Nu metal musical groups from California
Progressive rock musical groups from California